Cordelia the Magnificent is a 1923 American silent mystery film directed by George Archainbaud and starring Clara Kimball Young. It is now believed to be a lost film.

Plot summary
Cordelia, a smart and pretty society girl, becomes suddenly impoverished but decides to get a job rather than marry for money. A complicated blackmail plot ensues.

Cast
Clara Kimball Young
Huntley Gordon
Carol Halloway
Lloyd Whitlock
Jacqueline Gadsden
Lewis Dayton
Mary Jane Irving
Catherine Murphy
Elinor Hancock

Release
According to surviving accounts, the film was not well reviewed by major publications. It was, however, commercially successful.

References

External links
 
 Clara Kimball Young - Official Website

1923 films
1920s mystery drama films
American black-and-white films
American mystery drama films
American silent feature films
Films directed by George Archainbaud
Lost American films
1923 drama films
1920s American films
Silent American drama films
Silent mystery films